Somatina vestalis is a moth of the  family Geometridae. It is found in Kenya, Malawi, Mozambique, South Africa, Zambia and Zimbabwe.

References

Moths described in 1875
Scopulini
Moths of Africa